GlobeCore is a manufacturer and vendor of industrial equipment for production of bitumen emulsions, modified bitumen, oil regeneration and oil purification, fuel blending, biodiesel production, wet milling and nonoblending. Its headquarters are in Oldenburg, Germany.

About company
GlobeCore’s spectrum of services ranges from metal cutting to assembling of processing units. GlobeCore has facilities in several countries, including the United States, the UAE, and South Africa. Technical assistance to customers is provided by 17 dealer agencies worldwide.

Products
The following is a list of processing units manufactured by GlobeCore:
 mobile units for filtration, drying, degassing, regeneration of oil and other oil products 
 units for warming up and refilling of transformers 
 gearbox oil changing units for wind turbines  
 air drying units
 units for drying transformer solid insulation 
 colloid mills
 bitumen emulsion production units 
 polymer modified bitumen units
 units for wastewater treatment intensification 
 units for blending and on-line dissolving of liquids and for high-octane gasoline production 
 units for pumping adhesive materials
 bitumen filters
 bitumen storage tanks 
 laboratory units

Services
The company maintains, repairs and updates its own equipment and provides training for the customer's service staff.

Customers
GlobeCore serves the following companies and industries:
 power industry
 power generation companies
 power distribution companies
 power utilities
 transmission companies
 building companies

References

External links
 Official Site: Oil Regeneration Equipment
 The First in Tanzania Bitumen Emulsion Production Plant was Successfully Started Up
Manufacturing companies of Germany
Oldenburg Land